is a large trans-Neptunian object from the scattered disc located in the outermost region of the Solar System. The object was first observed by American astronomers Chad Trujillo and Scott Sheppard using the 4-meter Víctor M. Blanco Telescope at the Cerro Tololo Inter-American Observatory in Chile on 23 March 2017. Precovery observations were made by the Pan-STARRS-1 survey at Haleakalā Observatory and by the Dark Energy Survey with DECam, dating back as far as March 2012 and January 2016, respectively.

See also 
 List of possible dwarf planets
 List of Solar System objects most distant from the Sun

References

External links 
 The Kuiper Belt Electronic Newsletter, April 2018, Joel Parker, SWRI
 List Of Centaurs and Scattered-Disk Objects, Minor Planet Center
 
 

Minor planet object articles (unnumbered)

Possible dwarf planets

20170323